Birdik may refer to the following places in Kyrgyzstan:

Birdik, Alamüdün, a village in Alamüdün District, Chuy Region
Birdik, Ysyk-Ata, a village in Ysyk-Ata District, Chuy Region
Birdik, Nooken, a village in Nooken District, Jalal-Abad Region
Birdik, Toguz-Toro, a village in Toguz-Toro District, Jalal-Abad Region
Birdik, Naryn, a village in At-Bashy District, Naryn Region